Diamond in the Dirt may refer to:

 Diamond in the Dirt (album), a 2004 album by MC Shystie
 Diamond in the Dirt (EP), an EP by Mist